Garrett J. Cleavinger (born April 23, 1994) is an American professional baseball pitcher for the Tampa Bay Rays of Major League Baseball (MLB). He has previously played in MLB for the Philadelphia Phillies and Los Angeles Dodgers.

Amateur career
Cleavinger attended Lawrence High School in Lawrence, Kansas, graduating in 2012. As a senior, he was first-team all-state, first-team All-Sunflower League, first-team all-area, Player of the Year, and named a Central Region All-American by Perfect Game. 

Cleavinger attended the University of Oregon and played college baseball for the Oregon Ducks. He served as the closer for the Ducks in 2015. As a freshman in 2013, Cleavinger was 9–0 with a 1.24 ERA (2nd in the Pac-12 Conference) and two saves in 37 relief appearances (4th in the conference), and struck out 57 batters in  innings (averaging 11.7 strikeouts/9 innings, 4th-best in the conference). He set an Oregon freshman records for appearances and earned run average (ERA), and held opposing batters to a .137 batting average (the lowest single-season mark by an Oregon pitcher in school history). Cleavinger was named a freshman All-American by Louisville Slugger and the NCBWA (2nd Team). In 2014, he was 3–2 with two saves and a 3.34 ERA in 35 relief appearances (leading the conference) while striking out 13.6 batters/9 IP (also leading the conference). In 2013 and 2014, Cleavinger played collegiate summer baseball with the Falmouth Commodores of the Cape Cod Baseball League. In 2015, he was 6–2 with 9 saves (5th in the conference) and a 1.58 ERA in 37 relief appearances (5th), while leading the conference with 14.9 strikeouts/9 innings and allowing 4.5 hits/9 innings (4th). Cleavinger played for the Ducks alongside future Phillies teammate, pitcher Cole Irvin.

Professional career

Baltimore Orioles
The Baltimore Orioles selected Cleavinger in the third round of the 2015 MLB draft, and he made his professional debut with the Aberdeen IronBirds, posting a 6–1 record with a 2.19 ERA in 19 games. Cleavinger spent 2016 with the Delmarva Shorebirds and the Frederick Keys, going a combined 7–3 with a 3.07 ERA in a career-high  innings pitched. He was a 2016 South Atlantic League (SAL) Mid-Season All-Star. Cleavinger started 2017 with the Bowie Baysox.

Philadelphia Phillies
On July 28, 2017, the Orioles traded Cleavinger and Hyun-soo Kim to the Philadelphia Phillies for Jeremy Hellickson. The Phillies assigned Cleavinger to the Reading Fightin Phils. In 38 total games between Bowie and Reading in 2017, he posted a 2–5 record, a 6.00 ERA, and 59 strikeouts, in 54 innings. In 2018, between Clearwater and Reading, Cleavinger was 1–1 with a 7.43 ERA, and 18 strikeouts in  innings. 

Cleavinger returned to Reading to begin 2019. There, he was 3–2 with a 4.35 ERA in  innings, as he had the worst walks/9 innings ratio in the Eastern League (5.9), the 4th-best strikeouts/9 innings ratio (14.5), and the 6th-best hits/9 innings ratio (5.6). Cleavinger was added to the Phillies 40–man roster following the 2019 season.

Cleavinger was first called up by the Phillies on September 8, 2020, but did not pitch before being sent back down. Then, on September 15, he was promoted to the major leagues for the second time. Cleavinger made his MLB debut on September 17, against the New York Mets, at Citizens Bank Park.

Los Angeles Dodgers
On December 29, 2020, Cleavinger was traded to the Los Angeles Dodgers as part of a three-team trade that sent José Alvarado to the Phillies and minor leaguer Dillon Paulson and a player to be named later to the Tampa Bay Rays. On May 11, 2021, Cleavinger recorded his first career major league victory against the Seattle Mariners. He pitched in 22 games for the Dodgers, with a 2–4 record and 3.00 ERA.

Tampa Bay Rays
On August 1, 2022, Cleavinger was traded to the Tampa Bay Rays in exchange for minor leaguer German Tapia.

Personal life
Cleavinger's uncle Matt McWilliams played in the Atlanta Braves organization.

References

External links

1994 births
Living people
Sportspeople from Lawrence, Kansas
Baseball players from Kansas
Major League Baseball pitchers
Philadelphia Phillies players
Los Angeles Dodgers players
Tampa Bay Rays players
Oregon Ducks baseball players
Falmouth Commodores players
Aberdeen IronBirds players
Delmarva Shorebirds players
Frederick Keys players
Bowie Baysox players
Reading Fightin Phils players
Glendale Desert Dogs players
Clearwater Threshers players
Oklahoma City Dodgers players
Durham Bulls players